Seshadri Rao Gudlavalleru Engineering College is  located at Gudlavalleru, Krishna District, Andhra Pradesh, India.

Departments

Engineering Departments 
 Electrical and Electronics Engineering
 Electronics and Communication Engineering
 Civil Engineering
 Computer Science & Engineering
 Information Technology
 Mechanical Engineering
 Artificial Intelligence and Data Science
 Internet of Things
 Artificial Intelligence and Machine Learning
Science & humanities departments

 Chemistry Department
 English Department
 Mathematics Department
 Physics Department

Professional Departments 
 Master of Business Administration
 Library Science Department
 Physical Education

Genesis and growth of the college
Gudlavalleru Engineering College was  established in 1998, by the pragmatic, sagacious and prudent Sri Vallurupalli Venkata Rama Seshadri Rao , who was also a role model to the staff members. He is affectionately called as “The Father of Gudlavalleru Engineering College”. The institution is presently marching forward under the dynamic leadership of Dr. Nageswara Rao Vallurupalli present Chairman, as advisor was instrumental in the growth of the college in the initial 10 years. College was established in under the AANM & VVRSR Educational Society with an intake of 180 students with four branches of study. The present intake of the college in B.Tech is 1416( Additionally, 10% of sanctioned intake are admitted at First year B.Tech under EWS, and 10% of sanctioned intake are admitted at second B.Tech level under lateral entry scheme. M.Tech intake is 36 and the MBA is 60. The College name as was renamed in loving memory of our beloved "Father of Gudlavalleru Engineering College", Sri V. V. R. Seshadri Rao. AICTE accorded approval to rename our college as SESHADRI RAO GUDLAVALLERU ENGINEERING COLLEGE with effect from the Academic Year 2021-22. When it is to be used in short form SRGEC will be used. However, the EAMCET code remains as "GDLV"

Location
Gudlavalleru is a popular village in Andhra Pradesh, famous for its cattle fair and rice milling industry. Its villagers are known for their pioneering work in poultry and dairy farming. The village has been a hub of educational activity with a number of educational institutions located in it. Its Panchayat has the distinction of being honoured at the National level in 1973. Gudlavalleru is located on Gudivada-Machilipatnam route, well connected by road and rail to Vijayawada(55km), Machilipatnam(26km) and Gudivada(9km) and by rail to distant places like Hyderabad, Visakhapatnam, Tirupati, Chennai, Bangalore, Puri, Bilaspur and Jagdalpur.  

At the helm of College Administration

Dr.Nageswara Rao Vallurupalli - Chairman

Sri M.Srinivasa Rao - Co-chairman

Sri Satyanarayana Rao Vallurupalli - Secretary & Correspondent

Dr.P.Ravindra Babu - Advisor to the Management

Dr.GVSNRV Prasad - Principal

Dr.P.Kodanda Rama Rao - Vice Principal-Administration

Dr.MRCH Sastry - Vice Principal-Academics

Dr.P.Nageswara Reddy - Director (PG.Studies, Consultancy & Testing and R&D)

Dr.B.Karuna Kumar - Director(Academics Strengthening and Advancement)

Notable alumni 

 Om Suraj Gutti (Entrepreneur and Founder of Na Dhukan)
 Gowtham Tinnanuri (Film director)

Prominent Alumni 
Dr. V. Sunil Kumar, 1998-2002 Batch CSE, Director-Data Science, Ericsson GAIA, R&D India, Bengaluru
Mr. I. Kiran Prasad, 1998-2002 Batch, ME, Chief Human Resource Officer, Sesa Care  Pvt. Ltd.  Mumbai.
Dr. T. Narasa Reddy, 1998-2002 Batch, EEE Assistant Professor, School of Computing and Electrical Engineering, IIT Mandi.
Mr. N. Bhanu Gopal, 1999 Batch, ME, Project Manager, Tata Consultancy Services (TCS),  Hyderabad.
Mrs. Swapna  Priya Vattam, 1999-2003 Batch, ME Managing Partner, Redhan Engineering Services, Mumbai.
Mr. B. Arjun Kumar, 2002-06 Batch, IT, Scientist-C – NIC, Chandigarh. 
Dr. G. Kiran Kumar, 2002-06 Batch, ECE-HoD, ECE NIT AP, Tadepalligudam 
Mr.Thambi Prashank, 2004-08 Batch, EEE Physical Design Implementation Engineer, Google, Bengaluru.
Mrs.Tullimalli Madhuri, 2006-10 Batch, ECE Analog Layout Engineer, Intel Corporation, California, USA.
Dr. Hymavathi Madivada, 2004-08 Batch  ME Assistant Professor, NIT AP.
Mr. A. S. N. Malleswara Rao, 2004-08 Batch  CSE Team Lead, Microsoft Pvt Ltd, Hyderabad.
Mrs. G. Siva Lalitha, 2006-10 Batch   CSE, SSV Engineer, Infineon Technologies, Bangalore.
Mr Dhara Mahesh, 2007-11 Batch  IT, Director– Product Engineering, Forecast Era, Hyderabad.
Mrs. K. Sindhura, 2007-11 Batch  EEE, Senior Infotainment Project Engineer,  McLaren, London, UK.
Dr. B. Raghava Kumar, Batch 2007-2011 Batch, CE Project Scientist, National Institute of Ocean Technology, Chennai.
Dr. P. Harish, 2009-13 Batch, CE, Asst. Professor, BML Munjal University, Haryana
Mr. K. Raghavendhra, 2010-14, Batch   EEE, Scientist, BAARC
Ms. S. Padma Tejaswi, 2010-14 Batch  CE, Research Scholar, NIT Warangal. 
Mr. V. Prasanth, 2011-13 Batch, MBA Branch Manager, Axis Bank Pvt Ltd, Vijayawada.
Mr. M. V. Ravi Teja, 2012-16 Batch CSE, Data Analyst, AQR Technologies Pvt Ltd, Chennai.
Ms. L. Manasa. 2013-17 Batch, EEE Calibration Engineerr, Bosch  Pvt. Ltd.
Ms. P. Jayasree, 2013-17 Batch, CSE, Software Developer-II, S and P Capital IQ Private Limited, Hyd.
Mr. S. Rohith, 2014-18 Batch, ECE, PGP Student, IIM Nagpur.
Mr. V. Sai Krishna, 2014-16 Batch, MBA, Tax Consultant, Delloitte Tax Service India Pvt Ltd, Hyderabad.
Mr. K. Venkata Suresh Babu, 2015-19 Batch, CSE Senior Software Engineer, Geeky Ants, Bangalore.
Ms. J. Madhuri, 2017-19 Batch, MBA, Process Associate, BNY Mellon.

References

External links
 Gudlavalleru Engineering College at Colleges in AP
 Gudlavalleru Engineering College

Universities and colleges in Krishna district
Engineering colleges in Krishna district
Engineering colleges in Andhra Pradesh
Engineering universities and colleges in India
Educational institutions established in 1998
1998 establishments in Andhra Pradesh